Nicolás Lapentti was the defending champion, but lost in the third round to Sébastien Grosjean.

Gustavo Kuerten won in the final 3–6, 7–6(7–2), 7–6(7–2), against Marat Safin.

Seeds
The top eight seeds receive a bye into the second round.

Draw

Finals

Top half

Section 1

Section 2

Bottom half

Section 3

Section 4

External links
 Draw
 Qualifying draw

Singles